Basic Education High School No. 3 Dagon is a public high school located a few miles north of downtown Yangon, Myanmar. It was formerly Myoma Girls National High School founded at 32nd street in downtown Yangon in March 1921 as a sister school of Myoma Boys National High School. The school was moved to its current location in 1929.

Alumni
 Khin Hnin Yu:  Writer

Girls' schools in Yangon
High schools in Yangon